Wilburt "Red" Prysock (February 2, 1926 – July 19, 1993) was an American R&B tenor saxophonist, one of the early Coleman Hawkins-influenced saxophonists to move in the direction of rhythm and blues, rather than bebop.

Career
With Tiny Grimes and his Rocking Highlanders, Prysock staged a saxophone battle with Benny Golson on "Battle of the Mass". He first gained attention as a member of Tiny Bradshaw's band, playing the lead saxophone solo on his own "Soft", which was a hit for the Bradshaw band in 1952. Prysock also played with Roy Milton and Cootie Williams.

In 1954, he signed with Mercury Records as a bandleader and had his biggest hit, the instrumental "Hand Clappin'" in 1955. During the same year, he joined the band that played at Alan Freed's stage shows. He also played on several hit records by his brother, singer Arthur Prysock, in the 1960s.

Personal life
Prysock was born in 1926 in Greensboro, North Carolina, United States, and died of a heart attack in 1993 in Chicago, at the age of 67. He served in the United States Army during World War II which was when he learned to play saxophone. He was buried at the Salisbury National Cemetery in Salisbury, North Carolina.

Discography
 Rock and Roll (Mercury, 1956)
 Fruit Boots (Mercury, 1957)
 The Beat (Mercury, 1957)
 Swing Softly Red (Mercury, 1958)
 Battle Royal with Sil Austin (Mercury, 1959)
 The Big Sound of Red Prysock (Forum Circle, 1964)
 For Me and My Baby (Gateway, 1964; reissued on CD in 2003)

References

External links
 The Horn Blows : Red Prysock - JCMarion ©2002

1926 births
1993 deaths
American jazz tenor saxophonists
American male saxophonists
Soul-jazz saxophonists
Mercury Records artists
American bandleaders
Musicians from Greensboro, North Carolina
Chess Records artists
Jump blues musicians
20th-century American saxophonists
Jazz musicians from North Carolina
20th-century American male musicians
American male jazz musicians